Vicente Starikoff Ibarra (born 23 October 1995) is a Chilean footballer who plays as a centre-back for Chilean Segunda División side Deportes Colina.

Career
Vicente did all lower in Universidad Católica but his debut was in Rangers de Talca.

References

External links

Vicente Starikoff at playmakerstats.com (English version of ceroacero.es)

1995 births
Living people
People from Santiago
People from Santiago Province, Chile
People from Santiago Metropolitan Region
Footballers from Santiago
Chilean footballers
Association football defenders
Club Deportivo Universidad Católica footballers
Rangers de Talca footballers
Deportes Copiapó footballers
Deportes Recoleta footballers
Deportes Colina footballers
Chilean Primera División players
Primera B de Chile players
Segunda División Profesional de Chile players